Coleophora villosa is a moth of the family Coleophoridae. It is found in Kazakhstan.

The larvae feed on the generative organs of Kochia prostrate and Camphorosma lessingii.

References

villosa
Moths of Asia
Moths described in 1989